Lee Brookes (born 22 February 1968) is a British retired auto racing driver, who is still involved within motorsport, where he presently runs the Total Control Racing team. He is best known for his time racing in the British Touring Car Championship in the mid-nineties.

Racing career

Early years
Brookes was born in Walsall and started racing in karting. He was the Senior British Champion in 1990. In 1993 he raced in the Renault Elf oils Clio Challenge, finishing fourth on points in his first season. After finishing third in 1994, he became champion in 1995.

BTCC
In 1996 he entered the prestigious British Touring Car Championship, in an ex-works Toyota Carina. He won the Total Cup For Privateers with the TOM'S Team Brookes, ran by his father Jon. Although running as an independent driver, Brookes did have limited works backing from Toyota. In 1997 he replaced the car with a Peugeot 406 that had been used by the Peugeot works team the previous year. The car suffered reliability problems that he hadn't had with the previous years car. He finished second in the independents cup, narrowly losing out to Robb Gravett. He teamed up with Gravett a year later, Brookes Motorsport entered one Honda Accord for Gravett. Brookes himself raced in just two rounds at Oulton Park. The two drivers also entered the Bathurst 1000 that year. Brookes drove the Honda Accord for a part season in 1999, finishing fourth in the independents cup.

Brookes Motorsport reformed as TCR, which still runs on the TOCA support package, with some success.

Racing record

Complete British Touring Car Championship results
(key) (Races in bold indicate pole position – 1 point awarded all races) (Races in italics indicate fastest lap) (* signifies that driver lead feature race for at least one lap – 1 point given 1998 onwards)

References

External links
TCR official website
BTCC Pages profile

British Touring Car Championship drivers
1968 births
English racing drivers
Sportspeople from Walsall
Living people
Sports car racing team owners
Renault UK Clio Cup drivers
TOM'S drivers